Martyn Smith may refer to:

Martyn Smith (producer), British television producer
Martyn Smith (footballer) (born 1961), English footballer
Martyn Smith (rugby league) (born 1992), English rugby league player

See also
 Martin Smith (disambiguation)